On February 27, 1766, ten years before the American Declaration of Independence was published, a declaration was made in Leedstown, in what is now the U.S. state of Virginia, known as the Leedstown Resolutions, also known as the Westmoreland Resolves, Westmoreland Association, and the Northern Neck Declaration. The resolutions were against enforcement of the Stamp Act 1765.

A plaque commemorating the declaration in  Oak Grove, Westmoreland County, Virginia reads:

Resolutions text
The Leedstown Resolutions, February 27, 1766:

References

Documents of the American Revolution
1766 in the British Empire
Westmoreland County, Virginia